Frederiks is a small Danish town with a population of 1,843 (1 January 2022), on the road between Viborg and Herning. It is located in Viborg Municipality in central Jutland.

References

Cities and towns in the Central Denmark Region
Populated places established in 1906
1906 establishments in Denmark
Viborg Municipality